This is a list of awards and nominations received by South Korean boy band Shinhwa. The group debuted on March 24, 1998, with six members: Eric, Lee Min-woo, Kim Dong-wan, Shin Hye-sung, Jun Jin, and Andy. Shinhwa was initially formed under SM Entertainment; however, it moved to Good Entertainment in July 2003, upon the expiration of their contract. Whilst under Good Entertainment as Shinhwa, each of the members pursued their own solo careers under individual companies.

In 2011, members of the group formed 'Shinhwa Company' to continue to perform together. They made their comeback to the music industry in March 2012, after a four-year hiatus, during which the band members served individual mandatory military services, with the release of their tenth album The Return and concert tour.


Awards and nominations

See also
K-pop
Contemporary culture of South Korea
Korean music

References

External links 

 Shinhwa Company official homepage 
 Shinhwa Good Entertainment official homepage (2004–2008) 

Awards
Shinhwa